Dagenham was a local government district in south west Essex, England from 1926 to 1965 covering the parish of Dagenham. Initially created as an urban district, it was incorporated as a municipal borough in 1938. It was established to deal with the increase in population and the change from rural to urban area caused by the building of the Becontree estate by the London County Council and the subsequent movement of people from Inner London. Peripheral to London, the district formed part of the Metropolitan Police District and London Traffic Area. It now forms the eastern sections of the London Borough of Barking and Dagenham and the London Borough of Redbridge in Greater London.

Formation
Dagenham parish formed part of Romford Rural District from 1894. In 1920 it was suggested the parish should be removed from the rural district and its area divided between Ilford Urban District and Barking Town Urban District, because of the dramatic rise in population caused by the change in use of land from mostly farming to the large scale suburban housing development of the Becontree estate. Instead the urban district was created in 1926 from the parish of Dagenham.

District and borough
A move was mooted in 1929 to either combine Dagenham with Barking and Ilford (the three districts to contain parts of the Becontree estate), or for Dagenham to gain part of Barking; but it was not acted upon. The district became part of the London Passenger Transport Area from 1933.

Dagenham was incorporated as a municipal borough in 1938.

Initially the urban district council was based in Valence House, which it purchased from the London County Council in 1928. To replace this temporary accommodation, the council built a Civic Centre which was designed in art deco style.  The building officially opened in 1937 and is now used as by the Barking and Dagenham local authority. It is located at Becontree Heath, the ancient meeting place of the Becontree hundred. The first stone was ceremonially put in place in 1936 by Lord Snell, Chairman of the London County Council.

The parish and district included a long protrusion northwards to include Chadwell Heath, Marks Gate, Hog Hill and part of Hainault Forest, and formed a boundary with Chigwell.

The council exercised its right to be an excepted district, locally responsible for education, under the Education Act 1944.

Abolition
The borough was considered to form part of the Greater London Conurbation, as defined by the Registrar General. The Royal Commission on Local Government in Greater London considered the district for inclusion in Greater London and in 1965 it was abolished by the London Government Act 1963, with its former area transferred to Greater London from Essex, to be combined with parts of other districts, including Barking, to form the London Borough of Barking (now known as the London Borough of Barking and Dagenham). The northern tip of the protrusion northwards towards Chigwell became part of the London Borough of Redbridge along with the south eastern part of Chigwell Urban District.

Population
The population of the parish grew considerably after the building of the Becontree estate from 1921; it peaked in 1951. The introduction of industrial use such as the Ford Motor Company factory led to further increases in population.

References

Districts abolished by the London Government Act 1963
History of the London Borough of Barking and Dagenham
History of local government in London (1889–1965)
Municipal boroughs of England
Dagenham